Awards and decorations of the Armed Forces of the Philippines are military decorations which recognize service and personal accomplishments while a member of the Armed Forces of the Philippines (AFP).

Personal Decorations
The following are the authorized decorations of the AFP in their order of precedence:

 Medal of Valor 
 Philippine Legion of Honor 
Chief Commander (CCLH)
Grand Commander (GCLH)
Grand Officer (GOLH)
Commander (CLH)
Officer (OLH)
Legionnaire (LLH)
 Outstanding Achievement Medal 
 Distinguished Conduct Star
 Distinguished Service Star 
Gawad Sa Kapayapaan 
 Gold Cross 
 Distinguished Aviation Cross
 Distinguished Navy Cross 
 Silver Cross 
Meritorious Achievement Medal
Distinguished Service Medal 
Chairman of the Joint Chiefs of Staff, AFP Commendation Medal and Ribbon 
 Gawad sa Kaunlaran 
 Bronze Cross 
 Silver Wing Medal 
 Wounded Personnel Medal 
 Military Merit Medal 
Combat - Spearhead
Achievement/Service - Anahaw
 Sagisag ng Ulirang Kawal 
 Military Civic Action Medal 
 Parangal sa Kapanalig ng Sandatahang Lakas ng Pilipinas 
 Military Commendation Medal
 Armed Forces Conduct Medal
 Command Reservist (Volunteer) Officer and (Volunteer) Enlisted Personnel of the Year Medal and Ribbon 
 Kagitingan Sa Barangay 
Category of Lakan
Category of Datu
Category of Maginoo
 Civilian Employee's Honorary and Incentive Award 
Distinguished Honor Medal 
Superior Honor Medal
 Civilian Merit Medal 
 Annual Efficiency "E" Award for Naval Vessels

Outside the order of precedence:

 ROTC Cadet Officer and Cadet of the Year Award

Service Medals and Ribbons
The following service medals and ribbons are arranged alphabetically and follow no hierarchy or precedence:

 American Defense Service Medal (United States)
 Anti-Dissidence Campaign Medal & Ribbon
 Luzon Anti-Dissidence Campaign Medal & Ribbon
 Visayan Anti-Dissidence Campaign Medal & Ribbon
 Mindanao Anti-Dissidence Campaign Medal & Ribbon
 Asiatic–Pacific Campaign Medal (United States)
 Disaster Relief & Rehabilitation Operation Ribbon 
 Jolo and Sulu Campaign Medal & Ribbon
Kalayaan Island Group Campaign Medal and Ribbon
 Korean Campaign Medal
 Long Service Medal 
 Philippine Defense Medal & Ribbon 
 Philippine Independence Medal 
 Philippine Liberation Medal & Ribbon 
Presidential Security Service Ribbon
 Resistance Movement Medal
 United Nations Service Medal & Ribbon
 Vietnam Service Medal & Ribbon
 World War II Victory Medal (United States)

Unit Decorations
  Presidential Unit Citation 
  Martial Law Unit Citation
  People Power I Unit Citation 
  People Power II Unit Citation 
  Barangay Presidential Unit Citation Badge (BPUCB)

Badges
 AFP Enlisted Personnel of the Year Badge
 AFP ROTC Cadet of the Year Badge
 AFP Civilian Personnel of the Year Badge
  Combat Commander's (Kagitingan) Badge (CC(K)B)
 PAF Gold Wings Badge
 Command at Sea Badge
 Command Badge (Philippine Marines)
 Marksmanship Badge
  AFP Parachutist Badge
 Inspector General's Service (IGS) Badge
 Adjutant General's Service (AGS) Badge
 Infantry's Service (Inf) Badge
 Cavalry's Service (Cav) Badge
 Artillery's Service (FA) Badge
 Finance's Service Badge
 Ordnance and Chemical's Service (OS) Badge
 Military Intelligence's Service (MI) Badge
 Quartermaster's Service (QMS) Badge
 Psychological Operations (PsyOps) Badge
 Tanglaw Badge
  AFP Home Defense Badge
 PAF Aviation Badge
  Naval Aviation Badge
 Avionics/Aircraft Maintenance Officer Specialty Badge
 UOG/Seal Team Badge
 UOG/SCUBA Diver's Badge
  AFP Election Duty Badge
 Enlisted Personnel Administrative Assistant Course (EPAAC) Badge
  Scout Ranger Qualification Badge
  Special Forces Qualification Badge
 Air to Ground Operations Badge
  Naval Surface Warfare Badge
  Army Aviation Badge (Philippines)
 Army Instructor Badge
 Army Readiness Badge
 AFP Drill Master's Badge

Streamers
 Presidential Streamer
 Secretary of Defense Streamer
 Chief of Staff, AFP Streamer
 Commanding General, PA Streamer
 Commanding General, PAF Streamer
 Flag Officer-In-Command, PN Streamer

References

Footnotes

Citations
 Decorations and Medals of the Philippines
 Philippine Army Website - Awards & Decorations
 Armed Forces Philippines - Awards & Decorations

Bibliography
 The Adjutant General, AFP, AFP Awards and Decorations Handbook, 1995, 1997, OTAG.